Illinois Gateway Amendment may refer to:

 Illinois General Banking Law Amendment (1944)
 Illinois General Banking Law Amendment (1952)
 Illinois General Banking Law Amendment (1956)
 Illinois General Banking Law Amendment (1958)
 Illinois General Banking Law Amendment (1962)
 Illinois General Banking Law Amendment (1966)